Pseudomonas plecoglossicida is a non-fluorescent, Gram-negative, rod-shaped, motile bacterium that causes hemorrhagic ascites in the ayu fish (Plecoglossus altivelis), from which it derives its name. Based on 16S rRNA analysis, P. plecoglossicida has been placed in the P. putida group.

References

External links
Type strain of Pseudomonas plecoglossicida at BacDive -  the Bacterial Diversity Metadatabase

Pseudomonadales
Bacteria described in 2000